Hanzhong railway station is a railway station in Hantai District, Hanzhong, Shaanxi.

History
The station opened in October 1971 with the Yangpingguan–Ankang railway.

On 1 October 2009, the refurbishment of the station began in preparation for construction of the Xi'an–Chengdu high-speed railway. This work was completed and the station reopened on 16 January 2013.

Future
The under construction Hanzhong–Bazhong–Nanchong high-speed railway will serve this station.

References
 

Railway stations in Shaanxi
Railway stations in China opened in 1971